Ahrensberg may refer to:

 Ahrensberg (Habichtswald), a hill in Hesse, Germany
 Ahrensberg (Sackwald), a hill in Lower Saxony, Germany